Stage illusions are large-scale magic tricks. As the name implies, stage illusions are distinct from all other types of magic in that they are performed a considerable distance away from the audience, usually on a stage, in order to maintain the illusion. Stage illusions usually use large props and may involve the use of assistants or large animals. Examples of stage illusions include sawing a woman in half and Lady-to-Tiger.

Famous stage illusionists 
Criss Angel
Harry Blackstone Sr.
Harry Blackstone Jr.
Guy Bavli
Lance Burton
David Copperfield
John Daniel
Murray Hatfield
Doug Henning
Alexander Herrmann
Harry Houdini
Harry August Jansen
Jeff McBride
The Pendragons
Penn and Teller
Siegfried & Roy
Chung Ling Soo
P. C. Sorcar Jr.
Howard Thurston
Val Valentino

Stage illusions 

Aquarian Illusion
Asrah levitation
Assistant's Revenge
Aztec Lady
Balducci levitation
Battle of the Barrels
Bullet catch
Cabinet escape
David Copperfield's laser illusion
Devil's torture chamber
Guillotine
Impalement
Indian rope trick
Metamorphosis
Mismade Girl
Origami
Predicament escape
Radium Girl
Sawing a woman in half
Square Circle Production
Squeeze Box Illusion
Table of death
Wringer
Zig Zag Girl

References

Magic (illusion)